The Journal of Neuroscience is a weekly peer-reviewed scientific journal published by the Society for Neuroscience. It covers empirical research on all aspects of neuroscience. Its editor-in-chief is Marina Picciotto (Yale University). According to the Journal Citation Reports, the journal has a 2020 impact factor of 6.167.

History 
The journal was established in 1981 and issues appeared monthly; as its popularity grew it switched to a biweekly schedule in 1996 and then to a weekly in July 2003.

Themes

Main themes 
Articles appear within one of the following five sections of the journal:
 Cellular/Molecular
 Development/Plasticity/Repair 
 Systems/Circuits
 Behavioral/Cognitive
 Neurobiology of Disease
The journal has revised its sections over the years. In 2004, it added the Neurobiology of Disease section due to the growing number of papers on this subject. In January 2013, the journal split the section Behavioral/Systems/Cognitive into two sections, Systems/Circuits and Behavioral/Cognitive, in order to make the sections of the journal approximately the same in size.

Features 
In addition, some issues of the journal contain articles in the following sections:
 Brief Communications
 Journal Club (brief reviews of articles that appeared in the Journal; written by graduate students or postdoctoral fellows; first published in September 2005)

See also 
 Neuroscience
 Behavioral neuroscience

References

External links 

 

Neuroscience journals
Publications established in 1981
Weekly journals
English-language journals
Academic journals published by learned and professional societies